Pygopus homolog 1 (Drosophila) is a protein in humans that is encoded by the PYGO1 gene.

References

External links 
 PDBe-KB provides an overview of all the structure information available in the PDB for Human Pygopus homolog 1

Further reading 

Human proteins